Punctelia digitata is a species of foliose lichen in the family Parmeliaceae. Found in Brazil, it was described as a new species in 2009 by lichenologists Patrícia Jungbluth, Marcello Marcelli, and John Alan Elix. The holotype was collected  from Itirapina municipality in São Paulo State. The specific epithet digitata (Latin for "finger-like") refers to the characteristic shape of the lacinules (vegetative propagules). The lichen contains trace amounts of atranorin, and lecanoric acid as the main secondary metabolite.

References

digitata
Lichen species
Lichens described in 2009
Lichens of Brazil
Taxa named by John Alan Elix